ŠK Bosna, or Šahovski klub Bosna is a chess club from Sarajevo Canton, Bosnia and Herzegovina. The club is part of the University Sport Society USD Bosna. This club has achieved considerable success at competitions on the international stage.

Every May the club organizes an international chess tournament. In 2010 this was the 40th time it did so.

History

The club was founded in 1960, under the name ŠK Iskra. After joining USD Bosna, the club changed its name to ŠK Bosna on July 15, 1976.

Honours

Domestic competitions
Yugoslavian Chess Club Cup:
Winners (7) 1983, 1984, 1985, 1986, 1987, 1990, 1991

European competitions
European Chess Club Cup:
Winners (4) 1994, 1999, 2000, 2002

Notable players

  Garry Kasparov
  Predrag Nikolić
  Nebojša Nikolić
  Ivan Sokolov
 Bojan Kurajica

References

External links
ŠK Bosna

Sport in Sarajevo
Chess clubs